Italy has recognised same-sex civil unions since 5 June 2016, providing same-sex couples with most of the legal protections enjoyed by opposite-sex married couples. A bill to allow such unions, as well as gender-neutral registered partnerships, was approved by the Senate on 25 February 2016 and the Chamber of Deputies on 11 May and signed into law by the Italian President on 20 May of the same year. The law was published in the official gazette the next day and took effect on 5 June 2016. Before this, several regions had supported a national law on civil unions and some municipalities passed laws providing for civil unions, though the rights conferred by these civil unions varied from place to place.

History
In 1986, the Inter-parliamentary Women's Communist group and Arcigay (Italy's main gay rights organization) for the first time raised the issue of civil unions within the Italian Parliament. This was led by Ersilia Salvato in the Italian Senate and by Romano Bianchi and Angela Bottari in the lower house who together attempted to introduce the idea of legislation. In 1988, following lobbying by Arcigay, lawyer and socialist parliamentarian Alma Cappiello Agate introduced the first bill in Parliament (PdL N. 2340, Directive on the de facto family, 12 February 1988), calling for the acknowledgement of cohabitation between "persons". The bill failed, but Cappiello's proposal received wide coverage in the press (where some journalists spoke about second-class marriage), and acknowledged for the first time the possibility of homosexual unions.

During the 1990s, a succession of civil union bills was regularly introduced and rejected in Parliament, bolstered by discussion in the European Parliament on equal rights for homosexuals on marriage and adoption.

During the Parliament's XIII Legislature, at least ten bills were presented (by Nichi Vendola, Luigi Manconi, Gloria Buffo, Ersilia Salvato, Graziano Cioni, Antonio Soda, Luciana Sbarbati, Antonio Lisi, Anna Maria De Luca, and Mauro Paissan), none of which made it to a discussion on the floor of the House.

In September 2003, the European Parliament approved a new resolution on human rights against discrimination on the grounds of sexual orientation. Each member state had to confirm it would work to abolish any form of discrimination, legislative or de facto. During the XIV Legislature, a few proposals for civil unions with support across party lines were submitted to Parliament. On 8 July 2002 Franco Grillini, an MP for the Democrats of the Left, submitted for the first time a bill legalising same-sex marriage. However, the French model of PACS was given particular resonance by the union of Alessio De Giorgi and Christian Pierre Panicucci on 21 October 2002 at the French embassy in Rome. On the same day MP Grillini tabled a bill to the Chamber of Deputies introducing so-called civil solidarity pacts; it ultimately failed but had been supported by 161 centre-left MPs and PACS remained a centrepiece for the public discourse on same-sex couples' rights in Italy. This changed in 2005 when Spain's passage of same-sex marriage received wide coverage in Italy and triggered extensive political discussions.

2006-08: failed attempt to legalise domestic partnerships (DICO)
During the 2006 electoral campaign, the then leader of the opposition, Romano Prodi, promised to give legal rights to de facto couples if elected. Prodi's left-of-centre coalition subsequently won a majority in Parliament and was able to form the Prodi II Government. In February 2007 the government tabled a draft bill to recognise domestic partnerships under the name Diritti e doveri delle persone stabilmente Conviventi (DICO; English: Rights and duties of stable cohabitants). The bill faced considerable opposition from the Catholic Church, and in the Senate from the majority of the right-wing opposition and even from certain elements within Prodi's own fractious coalition. Delays meant the bill could not reach the floor for a conclusive vote.

A demonstration was held in Rome on 10 March 2007 in support of the legislation and in order to avoid it being forfeited by Prodi. Thousands of activists waved alarm clocks in the air, signalling it was high time for such a law. Some government officials (such as the Minister for Equal Opportunities, Barbara Pollastrini, and the Minister for Social Solidarity, Paolo Ferrero) took part in the demonstration and were later criticized by Prodi for their participation. Two days later, the Conference of Italian Bishops (CEI) staged a counter-demonstration, also in Rome. Police sources claim that about 800,000 people went to the demonstration, including some Catholic government ministers such as Clemente Mastella and Giuseppe Fioroni. On 16 June, the annual Rome Gay Pride hit a record attendance of about 1,000,000 demonstrators. The Pride parade had a strong political flavour, as LGBT associations meant it to be a response to the opposition demonstrations.

Later in the year, the DICO bill was merged with other civil union proposals and the Senate's Judiciary Committee discussed a new draft known as Contratto di Unione Solidale (Contract for Social Unions). Nevertheless, in February 2008, an early election was called, thus dissolving the incumbent Parliament, and all pending legislation died in committee.

Two Italian filmmakers, Gustav Hofer and Luca Ragazzi, followed the whole discussion of the DICO law and made an award-winning documentary Suddenly, Last Winter (Improvvisamente l'inverno scorso).

2008-15: new developments at judicial and local level
After the general elections of April 2008, there was no majority in Parliament in favour of legal recognition for same-sex unions. Although the governing majority (The People of Freedom - Lega Nord) of the Berlusconi Government was elected without promising any improvement for same-sex couples' rights, some party MPs (such as the Minister for Innovation and Public Administration, Renato Brunetta, along with Lucio Barani and Francesco De Luca) attempted to act independently and submitted legislation to the Parliament. A proposed private member's bill called DiDoRe (Diritti e Doveri di Reciprocità dei conviventi, English: Mutual rights and duties for cohabiting partners) was introduced, but was unsuccessful. If it had been adopted, it would only have been akin to "unregistered cohabitation", as it did not provide for a public registry system. Following the demise of the Berlusconi IV Cabinet in 2011, the new Monti Government did not enact either any legislation recognising same-sex relationships.

In these years, however, a number of significant developments came from the Italian judicial system and local politics.

Landmark judicial rulings

In 2009, a same-sex couple from Venice sued the local administration for denying them a marriage licence. The case was referred by the Tribunal of Venice to the Constitutional Court concerned at a possible conflict between the Civil Code (which does not allow for same-sex marriage) and articles 3 of the Italian Constitution (which forbids any kind of discrimination), and article 29 (which states an ambiguous gender-neutral definition of marriage).

On 14 April 2010 the Constitutional Court delivered a landmark decision (ruling 138/2010), establishing that the statutory ban on same-sex marriage was not in breach of the Constitution. However, the Court also affirmed that same-sex couples deserve legal recognition  since they are 'social formations' constitutionally protected under article 2 of the Constitution.  The task of drafting legislation to this purpose was deemed by the Court to be the Parliament's sole prerogative.

In January 2011, the Court of Cassation reversed a lower decision which stated that an EU citizen married to an Italian citizen of the same sex was not permitted to stay in Italy, because they were not a family according to Italian law. The High Court ruled that the lower judge should have applied the European Directive 2004/38/EC on the right of the citizens of the union to move and reside freely within the member states.

In 2012 the courts considered the case of a same-sex couple made up of an Italian man who married an Uruguayan citizen in Spain. In a landmark ruling, the Court of Cassation stated on 15 March that "same-sex couples have the same right to a family life as married straight couples", adding that "the judiciary shall grant them the same legal rights as enjoyed under marriage on a case-by-case rule". Even though the Court's judgments are not binding outside the case decided, lower courts find those judgments persuasive. Whereas the Parliament remains free to introduce same-sex unions or not, the verdict paved the way for such unions to be equivalent to marriage in all but name and for judges to recognize individual rights to cohabiting couples. Marriages performed abroad going forward would allow the non-EU national partner to obtain an Italian permanent residence permit.

On 9 February 2015 the Supreme Court of Cassation upheld the 2010 judgement of the Constitutional Court, by stating that opening marriage to same-sex couples was not unconstitutional, nor was it a constitutional right, but a parliament decision only, as well as introducing civil unions or civil partnerships.

On 21 July 2015 the European Court of Human Rights, in the case Oliari and Others v. Italy, ruled that Italy violated the European Convention on Human Rights by not recognising same-sex couples' right to family life.

Local civil union registries and other local initiatives

In July 2012 Giuliano Pisapia, mayor of Milan, Italy's second-largest city, promised to introduce a formal register of same-sex civil unions at city level, which would be designed to afford some legal protections to same-sex couples who cohabit, but these would not be equivalent to marriage rights. A spokesman for the Roman Catholic Archdiocese of Milan responded by arguing there was a "risk that giving equal status to families based on marriage with those founded on civil unions will legitimise polygamy".
On 27 July 2012 the Town Council approved the register in a 29-7 vote.

In January 2013 a hospital in Padua recognized same-sex parents for the first time in Italy. The hospital replaced the words "mother" and "father" with the gender-neutral word "parent". In August 2013, a Venice city councillor proposed to replace the word "mother" and "father" in local documents (on local school premises) with the words "parent 1" and "parent 2" (genitore 1 and genitore 2). The project ignited a debate in which the Minister of Integration, Cécile Kyenge, intervened and praised the bid. The motion was later not pursued. The Venice proposal then arrived in Bologna, where the executive body of the city proposed an alternative resolution, replacing "mother" and "father" with "parent" and "other parent" (genitore and altro genitore).

In January 2015, the Rome City Council approved, in a 32-10 vote, a civil union registry, allowing same-sex and opposite-sex civil unions to be registered in the city. The registry came into effect on 21 May 2015. That day, 20 couples, 14 of them same-sex and six of them opposite-sex, got married at Rome's City Hall.

On 4 March 2015, the Sicilian Regional Assembly voted by 50 votes to 5 (with 15 abstaining) in favour of the creation of a regional civil union register that allows couples of any sex to access all regional government benefits. The law was strongly supported by Rosario Crocetta, the first openly gay President of Sicily. Liguria and Sicily are the only two regions with such legislation.

By early 2016, more than 320 municipalities and cities throughout Italy had introduced civil union registries (registro delle unioni civili) providing same-sex couples with formal recognition and equal access to municipal services as other cohabiting or married opposite-sex couples. Due to the limited number of services managed at local level in Italy, these registries mostly had a symbolic value and were not legally binding for third parties. Major cities offering civil union registries include Rome, Bologna, Padua, Florence, Pisa, Bolzano, Palermo, Naples, Milan, Genoa, Bari, Catania, Brescia and Turin.

Civil unions
 
In July 2012 the Democratic Party approved its platform on civil rights, including legal recognition of same-sex unions. The secular wing of the party tried to pass a motion in favour of same-sex marriage, but did not gather enough support from the party committee for civil rights. The following day, the leader of the Five Star Movement, Beppe Grillo, criticised the decision and spoke out in favour of marriage for same-sex couples.

Following the 2013 Italian general election, on 28 April 2013 the Letta Government, a grand coalition cabinet, was formed by some members from PD, PdL and SC. Only the Democratic Party and SEL pledged support to same-sex relationship recognition during the political campaign. On 14 May 2013 the Italian Parliament extended healthcare benefits to MPs' same-sex partners. This rule had already been in effect for heterosexual partners for decades. The same month, an Italian judge registered an English civil partnership contracted by two Italian men. The registration occurred in Milan and the couple was registered in the local civil union register approved in 2012. The Equalities Minister, Josefa Idem (PD), then announced she would introduce a parliamentary bill which would recognise same-sex unions and cohabitants rights. In June, the Justice Commission of the Italian Senate started to examine several bills concerning the recognition of same-sex couples. Three bills (S.15, S.204 and S.393) were planned to allow same-sex couples to marry and the other three (S.197, S.239 and S.314) would allow them (and opposite-sex couples) to register their partnership as cohabitants.

Passage of legislation under the Renzi Government

On 15 December 2013 the newly elected secretary of the Democratic Party, Matteo Renzi, announced that the party would work on the recognition of same-sex relationships. While campaigning during the party primary elections, Renzi referred to the registered partnerships that were available in Germany between 2001 and 2017 as a model for new legislation to be introduced in Italy. German partnerships were open to same-sex couples only and by 2013 their scope had expanded coming to be equivalent to marriage except in name and in terms of full adoption rights. After the Letta government resigned, Renzi was appointed Prime Minister on 22 February 2014. Leading Italian politicians such as Ignazio Marino, the Mayor of Rome, Giuliano Pisapia of Milan, and Virginio Merola of Bologna, pressed for such legislation to be urgently passed.

In Autumn 2014 the government tabled a bill for debate in Parliament, but initially refused to make the vote on it a matter of confidence. The bill was reviewed by the Senate's Justice Committee and it was delayed several times due to the New Centre-Right filibustering. The bill would have guaranteed almost the same benefits reserved for marriage, but it would have been available to same-sex couples only. Furthermore, stepchild adoption was included while joint adoption wasn't. It was supported by a large majority: the Democratic Party, the Five Star Movement, half of Forza Italia, and Left Ecology Freedom. Some MPs opposed stepchild adoption, while others demanded same-sex marriage.

On 10 June 2015, the Chamber of Deputies, the lower house of the Italian Parliament, passed a motion formally supporting the introduction civil unions for same-sex couples. All major parties presented different motions, and all were rejected except for that of the Democratic Party. 

On 6 October 2015 a proposal merging several previous bills and establishing same-sex civil unions and gender-neutral cohabitation agreements was submitted to the Italian Senate by Monica Cirinnà, MP for the ruling Democratic Party. The bill underwent its first reading in the Senate on 14 October 2015. Although Berlusconi, leader of the opposition party Forza Italia, declared his support for both the recognition of same-sex couples and stepchild adoption, many MPs from his party criticised or opposed the bill. Stepchild adoption was soon considered the most contentious issue across party lines and it was vehemently opposed by New Centre-Right, a small Christian Democrat party which was part of the Renzi cabinet and whose votes were necessary to reach a majority in the Senate, where the Government's majority was slim. After having failed to garner support in Parliament from enough opposition MPs, the government asked for a confidence vote on an amended version of the bill which did not contain the contentious provisions on stepchild adoption.

On 25 February 2016 the bill was approved by the Italian Senate in a 173-71 vote. The law provides same-sex couples with most of the rights of marriage except parenting (stepchild or joint adoption) and reproductive rights (IVF for lesbian couples). On 8 March, the Justice Committee of the Chamber of Deputies started discussing the bill, and ultimately approved it on 20 April. On 27 April, the heads of parliamentary groups set a timetable for the floor debate, which would have begun on 9 May and ended on 12 May. On 11 May, the Chamber of Deputies approved the bill in a 372-51 vote, with 99 abstentions. It was subsequently signed by President Sergio Mattarella on 20 May. The law was published in the official gazette on 21 May and took effect on 5 June 2016. On 21 July, the Italian Council of State approved a government decree setting civil union registries across the country, allowing the first civil unions to be registered in Italy in the upcoming days. On 24 July, the first same-sex couple entered into a civil union, in Castel San Pietro Terme, near Bologna.

Same-sex marriage

Bills legalising same-sex marriage have been submitted to the Italian Parliament several times since Franco Grillini, an MP for the Democrats of the Left, first presented a proposal to the Chamber of Deputies in July 2002. It took 10 years before a party represented in Parliament made same-sex marriage a policy goal: in May 2012 Antonio Di Pietro, political leader of the Italy of Values (Italia dei Valori) party, said, "Our party has been the first in Italy to follow US president Barack Obama. We invite other Italian parties to support gay marriage. You don’t have to be shy, you have to say yes".. In July 2012 he also submitted a bill to the Chamber, but this was never considered by the Parliament.
Following the 2013 general election, several bills were presented during the XVII Legislature, some even allowing for full adoption rights and automatic recognition of the spouse's natural children born in wedlock. However, none of these bills ever advanced even to committee stage. 
As parliamentary discussions focused on the recognition of cohabitation agreements and registered partnerships for same-sex couples,  debate on same-sex marriage was relatively limited until passage of civil union legislation in 2016. However, the topic was far from absent from public discourse: it was a demand of Italian LGBT movements since at least the early 2000s and the subject of several judicial cases involving recognition of same-sex marriages performed abroad.

Legal battles to recognise marriages performed abroad
On 9 April 2014, the Civil Court of Grosseto ordered that a same-sex marriage contracted abroad be recognised in the municipality. The order was then voided by the Court of Appeals of Florence. Grosseto was followed by the cities of Bologna, Naples and Fano in July 2014, Empoli, Pordenone, Udine and Trieste in September 2014, and Florence, Piombino, Milan, Rome and Livorno in October 2014.

In 2014 the then Minister of the Interior, Angelino Alfano, ordered all prefects to invalid any registrations made by mayors recognising same-sex marriages performed abroad, arguing that the Italian Civil Code makes no mention of same-sex marriage and any attempt to recognise it is therefore illegal. The legal system had already been used to stop some mayors recognising same-sex couples, but all such cases were ultimately dismissed by the courts after failing to determine a particular offence. Indeed, a public prosecutor in the city of Udine ruled that a prefect may not invalidate marriages agreed by municipal mayors, thus effectively annulling the order made by Alfano. On 9 March 2015, the Regional Administrative Court of Lazio suspended Alfano's order because only civil courts may annul the registration of same-sex marriages contracted abroad. However, the court also found that overseas marriages could not be recognized in Italy because of the lack of domestic legislation.

Alfano subsequently appealed to the Council of State, Italy's highest administrative court. In October 2015, the Court reversed the judgement; ruling that it is within the role of prefectures to ensure all public acts are legal. Thus all registrations of same-sex marriages contracted abroad cannot be recognised in Italy and must be cancelled. Gay rights activists complained that Carlo Deodato, the Council of State judge who drafted the sentence, defines himself as "Catholic, married and father of two" and had already expressed his disapproval of same-sex marriage via Twitter and therefore could not be considered impartial. They promised to take an appeal to the European Court of Human Rights if necessary for violating the Italian Constitution.

On 31 January 2017, the Italian Constitutional Court ruled that a same-sex marriage, conducted between two women and performed in Nord-Pas-de-Calais in France, must be recognized in Italy. The Court refused to hear the case of the mayor of the small town of Santo Stefano del Sole, who was attempting to appeal an earlier sentence passed down from the Court of Appeal of Naples, in which the marriage was officially recognized. One of two women had the right to claim Italian citizenship jus sanguinis. Thus, refusal to recognize the union was seen as being in direct violation of the Charter of Fundamental Rights of the European Union, of the fundamental rights of European citizens, of the right of free movement for citizens throughout the member states and, lastly, of the basis of non-discrimination.

On 14 December 2017, the European Court of Human Rights ruled that Italy's refusal to legally recognise the marriages of same-sex couples married abroad violates the couples' rights to respect for private and family life. The 6 couples, (of which, 3 married in Canada, 2 in the Netherlands and 1 in California) sought to have their marriages registered in Italy but Italian officials had refused, citing a 2001 order by the Ministry of Internal Affairs which said same-sex marriage is "contrary to the norms of public order." The Court also ordered Italy to pay monetary compensation to the couples.

In May 2018, the Court of Cassation ruled that same-sex marriages performed abroad cannot be recognized in Italy. Instead, couples must register their partnerships as a civil union, regardless of whether they wed before or after Italy introduced civil unions in 2016. The ruling is the final judgement on an appeal lodged by an Italian-Brazilian couple who married in Brazil in 2012, and then performed another ceremony in Portugal in 2013. The couple sought to have their marriage recognized under Italian law in Milan but were denied, prompting them to mount a legal challenge that made its way to Italy's highest court. The judges agreed with an earlier appeals court ruling on the case, which stated that Italian law would recognise married same-sex couples only as civil unions. The Italian-Brazilian couple argued that the move constituted discriminatory "downgrading" of their relationship status. The Court of Cassation, however, judged that civil unions provide most of the same legal protections as marriages, and therefore could not be considered discrimination. "Same-sex marriage does not correspond to the model of matrimony outlined in our legal system," the judges stated, ruling that Italy may legitimately use its "legislative discretion" to exclude same-sex couples from marriage so long as a valid alternative is available to them.

Political developments following the passage of civil unions

At the 2018 general election, the only party campaigning for marriage equality and achieving parliamentary representation was Liberi e Uguali (LeU), who elected 14 deputies and 4 senators. A couple of bills legalizing same-sex marriage were submitted by Senator Cirinnà of the Democratic Party (PD) and Senator Maiorino of the Five Star Movement (M5S), but these did not advance beyond committee stage before Parliament was dissolved in July 2022. During the XVIII Legislature there was little political appetite for same-sex marriage and during the Conte II Government ruling M5S, PD and LeU threw their weight behind anti-LGBT discrimination and hate crimes legislation that passed the Chamber in November 2020 but ultimately failed in the Senate in October 2021.

At the 2022 general election same-sex marriage rose to prominence in Italian politics for the first time. M5S, PD, Alleanza Verdi Sinistra (AVS) and More Europe (+E) all endorsed marriage equality and full adoption rights in their electoral platforms (although PD did not take an official stance on LGBT adoption). Together these parties elected 136 deputies (out of 400) and 72 senators (out of 200), meaning that also in the XIX Legislature there is no parliamentary majority in favour of same-sex marriage. However, three bills have been presented to the Senate by Senator Malpezzi of PD, Senator Maiorino of M5S and Senator Scalfarotto of Action – Italia Viva (A-IV) and two bills to the Chamber of Deputies by MP Grimaldi of AVS and MP Appendino of M5S. On 27 December 2022 Senator Maiorino's bill (Senate bill n.130) advanced to committee stage but, as of February 2023, the Senate's Justice Committee has yet to review the bill.

On 26 February 2023 Elly Schlein won the primary elections of the Democratic Party, the largest centre-left opposition party, on a campaign platform advocating for same-sex marriage and full adoption rights.

Statistics
From July 2016 to late August 2016, 12 same-sex civil unions were performed in Italy. Turin performed one civil union, with 50 more ceremonies planned for the coming months. In Milan, six civil unions were performed with another 220 planned. Two civil unions took place in Florence and one in Naples. No civil unions took place in Rome in that period, but 111 civil union ceremonies followed in the coming months, of which 109 were between same-sex couples. The first civil union in Rome was performed on 17 September 2016.

Religious views

Roman Catholic Church

The Roman Catholic Church is the largest and most influential Christian denomination in Italy. It has been opposed to any recognition of same-sex relationships and repeatedly blocked the introduction of legislation such as domestic partnerships and civil unions for same-sex couples in Italy as well as other Catholic-majority countries. However, there has been public disagreement on the issue among senior figures in the Church and over the last few years a more welcoming and nuanced tone towards homosexual people has become common.

In 2007, Angelo Bagnasco (Archbishop of Genoa, and Chair of the Italian Bishop's Conference) compared the idea of recognising same-sex unions directly with state recognition for incest and paedophilia. He later condemned a ruling made by the Tuscan courts in 2014 which, for the first time in Italy, recognized the marriage of a same-sex couple who had wed in New York. He has also described civil unions and same-sex marriages as a "Trojan horse" that fundamentally weaken the institution of the family.

However, in his book Credere e conoscere, published shortly before his death in 2012, Cardinal Carlo Maria Martini, the former Archbishop of Milan, disagreed with opposition by Catholics to homosexual civil unions: "I disagree with the positions of those in the Church, that take issue with civil unions", he wrote. "It is not bad, instead of casual sex between men, that two people have a certain stability" and said that the "state could recognize them". Although he stated his belief that "the homosexual couple, as such, can never be totally equated to a marriage".

With the election of Pope Francis in 2013, the Catholic Church adopted a more welcoming attitude towards LGBT people. A few months after his election the Pope stated the now famous 'Who am I to judge (homosexual people)?'. In 2020 and 2021 Pope Francis voiced his support for civil unions, while maintaining opposition to same-sex marriage. This view, however impactful, represents the pope's personal views and does not change the official doctrine of the Church, which forbids blessings of all same-sex unions.

In May 2022 Pope Francis chose Cardinal Matteo Maria Zuppi to serve a five-year term as president of the Episcopal Conference of Italy, the official assembly of the Catholic bishops in Italy and the main body coordinating political relations between the Catholic Church and the Italian state.

Zuppi is widely regarded as a progressive within the Church and in June 2022 he was even accused of covering up the blessing of a same-sex couple after their civil union in Bologna, the diocese he has been Archbishop of since 2015. According to an Italian newspaper the Archdiocese of Bologna made a number of false claims in a statement attempting to justify the ceremony. The blessing of Pietro Morotti and Giacomo Spagnoli reportedly took place in the presence of six priests at the church of San Lorenzo di Budrio.

Other churches
The Union of Methodist and Waldensian Churches became the first Italian Christian denomination to permit the blessings of same-sex couples in 2010. The Lutheran Evangelical Church in Italy has allowed the blessings of same-sex unions since 2011.

Public opinion
During a protest on 13 January 2007, 50,000 gay rights activists, according to the police, protested in Milan in favour of the creation of a new law regulating same-sex unions.

According to a poll in February 2007, 67% of Italian Catholics backed the draft civil union bill proposed by the Prodi coalition, and 80% of Italians said they supported the law. On the other hand, the autumn 2006 Eurobarometer survey showed that only 31% of Italians thought that same-sex marriages should be allowed throughout Europe and 24% were in favour of opening up adoption to same-sex couples. This was below the European Union average of 44% and 32% respectively.

A Eurispes poll conducted in early 2009 showed that 40.4% of Italians supported same-sex civil marriage, while 18.5% supported civil unions but not marriage. Thus, 58.9% of respondents supported some form of recognition for same-sex couples. The only area with majority support for same-sex marriage was in the north-west (Piedmont and Liguria, where 54.8% were in favour). Nevertheless, in every Italian region except Sicily, a majority supported some form of recognition for same-sex couples. Among those who considered themselves on the political left, 66.5% supported same-sex marriage. The same poll was repeated in January 2010: 41.0% of respondents supported same-sex marriage, with 20.4% supporting civil unions. Thus, support for some form of recognition for same-sex couples rose to 61.4%.

On the occasion of the International Day against Homophobia on 17 May 2012, the National Bureau of Statistics (ISTAT) released an official governmental report on the attitudes towards homosexuality among the Italian population. The poll, conducted in 2011, found that 62.8% of the interviewees were in favour of civil unions with the same rights as marriage. Those who agreed with same-sex marriage increased to 43.9%, with central Italy (52.6%), 18–34 years old (53.4%) and women (47%) being the geographical, age and gender categories most in favour. Significantly, every region supported civil unions, with support being highest in central Italy (72.2%) and lowest in the south (51.2%).

A May 2013 Ipsos poll found that 48% of respondents were in favour of same-sex marriage and another 31% supported other forms of recognition for same-sex couples. According to an Ifop poll, conducted in May 2013, 42% of Italians supported allowing same-sex couples to marry and adopt children.

An October 2014 Demos poll found that 55% of respondents were in favour of same-sex marriage with 42% against.

The 2015 Eurobarometer found that 55% of Italians thought that same-sex marriage should be allowed throughout Europe, 35% were against.

In January 2016, a poll showed that 46% were in favour of same-sex civil unions with 40% against. With regards to same-sex marriage, 38% were in favour and 55% were against. Finally, 85% of those polled were against adoption by same-sex couples. In February 2016, days after the Senate approved the civil union bill, a new poll showed again a large majority in favour of civil unions (69%), a majority for same-sex marriage (56%), but still, only a minority approving of stepchild adoption (37%).

A Pew Research Center poll, conducted between April and August 2017 and published in May 2018, showed that 59% of Italians supported same-sex marriage, 38% were opposed and 3% didn't know or refused to answer. When divided by religion, 83% of religiously unaffiliated people, 70% of non-practicing Christians and 44% of church-attending Christians supported same-sex marriage. Opposition was 27% among 18-34-year-olds.

In 2019, a poll conducted by Eurispes found that 51% of Italians supported the legalisation of same-sex marriage. Same-sex adoption was supported by 31.1%, while 68.9% were against it. According to a May 2019 Ipsos poll, 58% of Italians were in favour of same-sex marriage.

The 2019 Eurobarometer found that 58% of Italians thought same-sex marriage should be allowed throughout Europe, 35% were against.

See also 
 LGBT rights in Italy
 Recognition of same-sex unions in Europe

Notes

References

External links

LGBT rights in Italy
Italy